Lovebug is an insect in the march fly family. 

(The) Love bug(s), Love Bug(s), or Lovebug(s) may also refer to:

Films
 The Love Bug (1925 film), an Our Gang short
 The Love Bug, a 1968 Disney film about an anthropomorphic Volkswagen Beetle
 Disney's The Love Bug (1997 film), a made-for-TV sequel to the 1968 film
 The Love Bugs, a 1917 film starring Oliver Hardy

Music

Albums
 Love Bug (Reuben Wilson album), 1969
 Love Bug (George Jones album), 1966
 Love Bug (Raffi), 2014

Performers
 Lovebugs (band), a Swiss band
 Lovebug Starski (born 1960), an American rapper

Songs
 "Lovebug" (Jonas Brothers song), 2008
 "Love Bug" (George Jones song), 1965, later covered in 1994 by George Strait
 "The Love Bug" (song), a 2004 song by M-Flo that features BoA
 "Love Bug", a song by GFriend from their 2018 album Time for the Moon Night
 "Love Bug", a song by Marcy Playground from their 1999 album Shapeshifter
 "Love Bug", a 1977 song written by Ron Roker for Tina Charles

Television
 Love Bug (Philippine TV program), 2010
 Herbie, the Love Bug (TV series), a 1982 Disney/CBS television series follow-up to the 1968 film
 Un gars, une fille, a Canadian television series known as Love Bugs in Italy

Other uses
 ILOVEYOU, a computer virus also known as the Love Bug worm
 Love Bug, a 1974 Volkswagen Beetle model marketed in North America

See also
 "Love Bug Leave My Heart Alone", a 1967 song by Martha & the Vandellas
 "The Love Bug Will Bite You (If You Don't Watch Out)", a 1937 song by Pinky Tomlin